Domel Nisar, also Damil nisar, or Dammer Nisar is a town, in Chitral District, Khyber Pakhtunkhwa Province in Pakistan. The Dameli language is spoken in this region.

The union council includes the northern parts of Chitral town, including the areas of Thingshen and Jang Bazar.

See also 

 Arandu, Khyber Pakhtunkhwa
 Chitral District

References

External links
Khyber-Pakhtunkhwa Government website section on Lower Dir
United Nations

Chitral District
Tehsils of Chitral District
Union councils of Khyber Pakhtunkhwa
Populated places in Chitral District
Union councils of Chitral District